Gagea bulbifera is a Eurasian species of plants in the lily family, widespread from Romania to Xinjiang. It is native to Romania,  Russia (North Caucasus, West Siberia Krai, Altay Krai), South Caucasus, Kazakhstan, Kyrgyzstan, Iran, Turkey, Xinjiang, Western Himalayas.

Gagea bulbifera is a bulb-forming perennial up to 60 cm tall. Flowers are yellow with green on the backs of each of the tepals.

References

bulbifera
Flora of Europe
Flora of Asia
Plants described in 1773